Iván Alejo Peralta (born 10 February 1995) is a Spanish professional soccer player who plays for Cádiz CF as a right winger.

Club career
Born in Valladolid, Castile and León, Alejo joined Atlético Madrid youth setup in 2011 from Real Valladolid. He made his senior debut for the former's C-team in 2014, in Tercera División.

Alejo was promoted to the reserves in Segunda División B in July 2014. After suffering relegation, he agreed to a three-year deal with another reserve team, Villarreal CF B also in the third division.

On 19 July 2016, Alejo signed a two-year contract with Segunda División club AD Alcorcón. He made his professional debut on 20 August, coming on as a second-half substitute for Sergio Aguza in a 0–0 home draw against SD Huesca.

Alejo scored his first goal as a professional on 13 May 2017, netting the first in a 2–0 home win against Rayo Vallecano, but was sent off a minute later. On 14 June, after helping the Madrid side avoid relegation, he signed a four-year contract with SD Eibar.

Alejo made his debut in La Liga on 21 August 2017, replacing goalscorer Charles in a 1–0 away win over Málaga CF. He scored his first goal in the category on 3 December, netting his team's second in a 3–1 home defeat of RCD Espanyol.

On 26 July 2018, Alejo signed a five-year contract with fellow top division side Getafe CF. The following 31 January, after being rarely used, he was loaned to second division side Málaga CF until the end of the season.

On 30 August 2019, Alejo moved to Cádiz CF in the second level, also in a temporary deal, signed until the end of the season. The following 22 July, after achieving promotion, the club exercised the obligatory buyout clause and signed him permanently until 2025.

Personal life
In March 2020, Alejo donated 10,000 euros to the Hospital Clínico Universitario de Valladolid for the purchase of sanitary supplies needed during the COVID-19 pandemic.

Career statistics

Club

References

External links

1995 births
Living people
Spanish footballers
Footballers from Valladolid
Association football wingers
Spain youth international footballers
La Liga players
Segunda División players
Segunda División B players
Tercera División players
Atlético Madrid C players
Atlético Madrid B players
Villarreal CF B players
AD Alcorcón footballers
SD Eibar footballers
Getafe CF footballers
Málaga CF players
Cádiz CF players